Forkead box I3 (FOXI3) is a protein that in humans is encoded by the FOXI3 gene. FOXI3 is a forkhead box transcription factor that is expressed in the development of hair and teeth. One of its mutations is a dominant allele responsible for the heterozygous Hh hairless trait in dogs. It was identified in 2008.

See also 
 Chinese Crested Dog
 Mexican Hairless Dog
 Peruvian Inca Orchid (Peruvian Hairless Dog)
 Dog coat genetics

References 

Animal hair
Genes
Forkhead transcription factors